Gambeya albida, commonly known as white star apple, is a forest fruit tree commonly found throughout tropical Africa. It is closely related to the African star apple (Gambeya africana) which is also common throughout West Africa. Some schools of thought feel that they may just be a variety of the same species. Also in the family is the purple star apple (Chrysophyllum cainito).

Amongst the Yoruba of Nigeria, it is called Agbalumo while it is called udala (udara) in  the Igbo, Udari among the Efiks of Southern Nigeria with the usage of the latter term, coincidentally, also permeating across much of south-western Nigeria (i.e.,further east of Akoko-Ondo) the northern (Hausa-Fulani) parts of the country. One local enduring sobriquet is derived from the  Yoruba agbalumo, i.e., ‘agbaluma,’ and is used in certain parts of Nigeria.

The inherent sweetness of a child (or person of especially-seasoned cognisance/age who otherwise displays certain amiability-desirable characteristics representative of children and/or well-adjusted adults, e.g., well-roundedness, joviality, unassuming understanding) has been likened to the fruit in  Igbo, as ‘udala nwannu.’

References

 National Research Council. 2008. Lost Crops of Africa: Volume III: Fruits. Washington, DC: The National Academies Press. https://doi.org/10.17226/11879

External links
Interagency Taxonomic Information System
Kew Royal Botanic Gardens

Chrysophylloideae
Trees of Africa
Fruits originating in Africa
Afrotropical realm flora

National Research Council. 2008. Lost Crops of Africa: Volume III: Fruits. Washington, DC: The National Academies Press. https://doi.org/10.17226/11879